Omorgus procerus is a species of hide beetle in the subfamily Omorginae and subgenus Afromorgus.

References

procerus
Beetles described in 1872